Stanislav Moravec  (born 8 March 1964) is a former Slovak football player. He played for FK Inter Bratislava. He earned 4 caps for the Slovakia national football team. Since 2001 he has been a football coach currently managing Al-Ahli B team.

Club career
Moravec played for FC Martigues in the French Ligue 2 during the 1990-1992 seasons.

References

External links
 
 

1964 births
Living people
Slovak footballers
Slovakia international footballers
FK Inter Bratislava players
ŠK Slovan Bratislava players
FC Martigues players
Ligue 2 players
Expatriate footballers in France
Association football midfielders